Balson is a surname. Notable people with the surname include:

 Allison Balson (born 1969), American actress, singer, and songwriter
 Mike Balson (1947–2019), English footballer
 Ralph Balson (1890–1964), English-born Australian artist